RFC Raiders is an Icelandic rugby team based in Reykjavík.

References

Rugby clubs established in 2010
Rugby union in Iceland